Spirit River can refer to:

 Spirit River (Alberta), a river in northern Alberta, Canada
 Spirit River, Alberta, a town in northern Alberta, Canada
 Spirit River (electoral district), a defunct provincial electoral district in Alberta, Canada from 1940 to 1971
 Spirit River-Fairview, a defunct provincial electoral district in Alberta, Canada from 1971 to 1986
 Spirit River Airport, an airport in Spirit River, Alberta, Canada
 Municipal District of Spirit River No. 133, a municipal district in northern Alberta, Canada
 Spirit River Formation, a geological unit of the Western Canadian Sedimentary Basin
 Spirit River Highway, alternate name for Alberta Highway 49 and British Columbia Highway 49, part of the Northern Woods and Water Route in Western Canada
 Spirit River (Wisconsin), river in Price County, Wisconsin and Lincoln County, Wisconsin